Naumachius was a Greek gnomic poet.

Of his poems, seventy-three hexameters (in three fragments) are preserved by Stobaeus in his Florilegium; they deal mainly with the duty of a good wife. From the remarks on celibacy and the allusion to a mystic marriage it has been conjectured that the author was a Christian.

The Greek fragments, very loosely translated (anonymously) into English under the title of Advice to the Fair Sex (London 1736), are in Gaisford's Poetae minores Graeci, i (Oxford 1823) 461-5, and (all three fragments together as one continuous  passage) in Ernst Heitsch, Die griechischen Dichterfragmente der Römischen Kaiserzeit (Göttingen 1961) 92-4.

References

Ancient Greek poets
Year of birth unknown
Year of death unknown